Preston D. Richards (September 15, 1881 – January 31, 1952) was an assistant solicitor for the United States Department of State under J. Reuben Clark during the Taft administration. He was also a leader in the Church of Jesus Christ of Latter-day Saints and instrumental in securing the building permits for the Los Angeles California Temple.

Early life and career 

Richards, a lawyer, became assistant solicitor of the state department and later formed a private law firm with J. Reuben Clark. Hugh B. Brown would later work for this law firm. Richards was law partners with J. Reuben Clark and Albert E. Bowen.

Richards was an assistant solicitor for the United States Department of State under J. Reuben Clark during the Taft administration. While working in Washington, D.C. he authored the proclamation of Arizona's statehood and wrote the text to at least one constitutional amendment. Richards served as a Utah State Senator during the 1907 legislative session.

Church service 

Richards wrote a 1907 biography of early Mormon leader Willard Richards and in 1920, was a member of the general board of the LDS Church's Young Men's Mutual Improvement Association.

Richards worked pro bono to help secure the approvals needed for the construction of the Los Angeles, California Temple. Then when the construction was delayed during the Korean War due to steel shortages, Richards and Edward O. Anderson were sent to negotiate with the National Production Authority. The temple was soon designated an ongoing construction project and made exempt from steel rationing requirements. Richards was present at the groundbreaking and helped lead fundraising efforts. He died before seeing the temple's completion.

References

External links 
 Collection of Letters to LDS Church Leaders

1881 births
American leaders of the Church of Jesus Christ of Latter-day Saints
American lawyers
Year of death missing
Young Men (organization) people
Richards–Young family
University of Chicago Law School alumni
Latter Day Saints from Illinois